The large woodshrike (Tephrodornis virgatus) is found in south-eastern Asia, Sumatra, Java, and Borneo. Its natural habitats are temperate forest, subtropical or tropical moist lowland forest, subtropical or tropical mangrove forest, and subtropical or tropical moist montane forest.

Taxonomy
It is usually placed in the family Vangidae. The Malabar woodshrike is sometimes considered conspecific with the large woodshrike.

Subspecies 

 Tephrodornis virgatus virgatus, found in southwest and south Sumatra and Java.
 Tephrodornis virgatus pelvicus, found in the east Himalayas to north Myanmar.
 Tephrodornis virgatus jugans, found in southern Myanmar and North Thailand.
 Tephrodornis virgatus verneyi, found in southwest Thailand.
 Tephrodornis virgatus annectens, found on the northern Malay Peninsula.
 Tephrodornis virgatus fretensis, found on the southern Malay Peninsula and Sumatra.
 Tephrodornis virgatus mekongensis, found in eastern and southern Thailand and Cambodia.
 Tephrodornis virgatus hainanus, found in north Indochina and Hainan.
 Tephrodornis virgatus latouchei, found in Fujian.
 Tephrodornis virgatus frenatus, found on Borneo.

References

large woodshrike
Birds of Eastern Himalaya
Birds of Bangladesh
Birds of Southeast Asia
large woodshrike
Taxonomy articles created by Polbot